Shahuwadi is a tehsil in the Karvir subdivision of the Kolhapur district in the Indian state of Maharashtra.

As India expanded in 1949, Kolhapur was redistricted and expanded to include Shahuwadi.

The Amba Ghat mountain pass on Ratnagiri-Kolhapur road (NH 204) is nearby. Shahuwadi has 145 villages. The distance between Kohalpur and Shahuwadi is 46.5km.

Historical places

 Ganpati Mandhir
 Pawankhind
 Old Palace
 Laxmi Vilas Palace
 Shalini Palace
 Dongrai Buddhist Caves
 Teen Darwaja
 Sandhya Math
 Dutondi Buruj
 Panhala Fort
 Naykinicha Sajja
 Ambarkhana

Language
The official languages are English and Marathi.

References

Cities and towns in Kolhapur district
Talukas in Maharashtra
Kolhapur district